Mosque of Bani Haram is one of the historic mosques in Medina, Saudi Arabia. It stands in the area where the tribe of Bani Haram lived, and it was used as a base camp during the Battle of the Trench. It is also believed to be the place where the Islamic prophet Muhammad stopped by for prayer during digging of a trench before the battle. The house of Jabir ibn Abd Allah, one of Muhammad's companions, was located here, and several accounts of miracles are considered to be witnessed in his house.

See also

 List of mosques in Saudi Arabia
  Lists of mosques 
 List of mosques in Medina

Referensi 

Mosques in Medina